Corey Hall may refer to:
 Corey Hall (rugby league)
 Corey Hall (American football)

See also
 Cory Hall, American football coach and player
 Korey Hall, American football player